Systems engineering is an interdisciplinary field of engineering and engineering management that focuses on how to design, integrate, and manage complex systems over their life cycles. At its core, systems engineering utilizes systems thinking principles to organize this body of knowledge. The individual outcome of such efforts, an engineered system, can be defined as a combination of components that work in synergy to collectively perform a useful function.

Issues such as requirements engineering, reliability, logistics, coordination of different teams, testing and evaluation, maintainability and many other disciplines necessary for successful system design, development, implementation, and ultimate decommission become more difficult when dealing with large or complex projects. Systems engineering deals with work-processes, optimization methods, and risk management tools in such projects. It overlaps technical and human-centered disciplines such as industrial engineering, production systems engineering, process systems engineering, mechanical engineering, manufacturing engineering, production engineering, control engineering, software engineering, electrical engineering, cybernetics, aerospace engineering, organizational studies, civil engineering and project management. Systems engineering ensures that all likely aspects of a project or system are considered and integrated into a whole.

The systems engineering process is a discovery process that is quite unlike a manufacturing process. A manufacturing process is focused on repetitive activities that achieve high quality outputs with minimum cost and time. The systems engineering process must begin by discovering the real problems that need to be resolved, and identifying the most probable or highest impact failures that can occur—systems engineering involves finding solutions to these problems.

History

The term systems engineering can be traced back to Bell Telephone Laboratories in the 1940s. The need to identify and manipulate the properties of a system as a whole, which in complex engineering projects may greatly differ from the sum of the parts' properties, motivated various industries, especially those developing systems for the U.S. military, to apply the discipline.

When it was no longer possible to rely on design evolution to improve upon a system and the existing tools were not sufficient to meet growing demands, new methods began to be developed that addressed the complexity directly. The continuing evolution of systems engineering comprises the development and identification of new methods and modeling techniques. These methods aid in a better comprehension of the design and developmental control of engineering systems as they grow more complex. Popular tools that are often used in the systems engineering context were developed during these times, including USL, UML, QFD, and IDEF.

In 1990, a professional society for systems engineering, the National Council on Systems Engineering (NCOSE), was founded by representatives from a number of U.S. corporations and organizations. NCOSE was created to address the need for improvements in systems engineering practices and education. As a result of growing involvement from systems engineers outside of the U.S., the name of the organization was changed to the International Council on Systems Engineering (INCOSE) in 1995. Schools in several countries offer graduate programs in systems engineering, and continuing education options are also available for practicing engineers.

Concept

Systems engineering signifies only an approach and, more recently, a discipline in engineering. The aim of education in systems engineering is to formalize various approaches simply and in doing so, identify new methods and research opportunities similar to that which occurs in other fields of engineering. As an approach, systems engineering is holistic and interdisciplinary in flavour.

Origins and traditional scope
The traditional scope of engineering embraces the conception, design, development, production and operation of physical systems. Systems engineering, as originally conceived, falls within this scope. "Systems engineering", in this sense of the term, refers to the building of engineering concepts.

Evolution to broader scope
The use of the term "systems engineer" has evolved over time to embrace a wider, more holistic concept of "systems" and of engineering processes. This evolution of the definition has been a subject of ongoing controversy, and the term continues to apply to both the narrower and broader scope.

Traditional systems engineering was seen as a branch of engineering in the classical sense, that is, as applied only to physical systems, such as spacecraft and aircraft. More recently, systems engineering has evolved to take on a broader meaning especially when humans were seen as an essential component of a system. Peter Checkland, for example, captures the broader meaning of systems engineering by stating that 'engineering' "can be read in its general sense; you can engineer a meeting or a political agreement."

Consistent with the broader scope of systems engineering, the Systems Engineering Body of Knowledge (SEBoK) has defined three types of systems engineering:
 Product Systems Engineering (PSE) is the traditional systems engineering focused on the design of physical systems consisting of hardware and software.
 Enterprise Systems Engineering (ESE) pertains to the view of enterprises, that is, organizations or combinations of organizations, as systems.
 Service Systems Engineering (SSE) has to do with the engineering of service systems. Checkland defines a service system as a system which is conceived as serving another system. Most civil infrastructure systems are service systems.

Holistic view
Systems engineering focuses on analyzing and eliciting customer needs and required functionality early in the development cycle, documenting requirements, then proceeding with design synthesis and system validation while considering the complete problem, the system lifecycle. This includes fully understanding all of the stakeholders involved. Oliver et al. claim that the systems engineering process can be decomposed into:
 A Systems Engineering Technical Process
 A Systems Engineering Management Process

Within Oliver's model, the goal of the Management Process is to organize the technical effort in the lifecycle, while the Technical Process includes assessing available information, defining effectiveness measures, to create a behavior model, create a structure model, perform trade-off analysis, and create sequential build & test plan.

Depending on their application, although there are several models that are used in the industry, all of them aim to identify the relation between the various stages mentioned above and incorporate feedback. Examples of such models include the Waterfall model and the VEE model (also called the V model).

Interdisciplinary field
System development often requires contribution from diverse technical disciplines. By providing a systems (holistic) view of the development effort, systems engineering helps mold all the technical contributors into a unified team effort, forming a structured development process that proceeds from concept to production to operation and, in some cases, to termination and disposal. In an acquisition, the holistic integrative discipline combines contributions and balances tradeoffs among cost, schedule, and performance while maintaining an acceptable level of risk covering the entire life cycle of the item.

This perspective is often replicated in educational programs, in that systems engineering courses are taught by faculty from other engineering departments, which helps create an interdisciplinary environment.

Managing complexity
The need for systems engineering arose with the increase in complexity of systems and projects, in turn exponentially increasing the possibility of component friction, and therefore the unreliability of the design. When speaking in this context, complexity incorporates not only engineering systems, but also the logical human organization of data. At the same time, a system can become more complex due to an increase in size as well as with an increase in the amount of data, variables, or the number of fields that are involved in the design. The International Space Station is an example of such a system.

The development of smarter control algorithms, microprocessor design, and analysis of environmental systems also come within the purview of systems engineering. Systems engineering encourages the use of tools and methods to better comprehend and manage complexity in systems. Some examples of these tools can be seen here:
 System architecture
 System model, modeling, and simulation
 Mathematical optimization
 System dynamics
 Systems analysis
 Statistical analysis
 Reliability engineering
 Decision making

Taking an interdisciplinary approach to engineering systems is inherently complex since the behavior of and interaction among system components is not always immediately well defined or understood. Defining and characterizing such systems and subsystems and the interactions among them is one of the goals of systems engineering. In doing so, the gap that exists between informal requirements from users, operators, marketing organizations, and technical specifications is successfully bridged.

Scope

The principles of systems engineering – holism, emergent behavior, boundary, et al. – can be applied to any system, complex or otherwise, provided systems thinking is employed at all levels. Besides defense and aerospace, many information and technology based companies, software development firms, and industries in the field of electronics & communications require systems engineers as part of their team.

An analysis by the INCOSE Systems Engineering center of excellence (SECOE) indicates that optimal effort spent on systems engineering is about 15–20% of the total project effort. At the same time, studies have shown that systems engineering essentially leads to reduction in costs among other benefits. However, no quantitative survey at a larger scale encompassing a wide variety of industries has been conducted until recently. Such studies are underway to determine the effectiveness and quantify the benefits of systems engineering.

Systems engineering encourages the use of modeling and simulation to validate assumptions or theories on systems and the interactions within them.

Use of methods that allow early detection of possible failures, in safety engineering, are integrated into the design process. At the same time, decisions made at the beginning of a project whose consequences are not clearly understood can have enormous implications later in the life of a system, and it is the task of the modern systems engineer to explore these issues and make critical decisions. No method guarantees today's decisions will still be valid when a system goes into service years or decades after first conceived. However, there are techniques that support the process of systems engineering. Examples include soft systems methodology, Jay Wright Forrester's System dynamics method, and the Unified Modeling Language (UML)—all currently being explored, evaluated, and developed to support the engineering decision process.

Education

Education in systems engineering is often seen as an extension to the regular engineering courses, reflecting the industry attitude that engineering students need a foundational background in one of the traditional engineering disciplines (e.g. aerospace engineering, civil engineering, electrical engineering, mechanical engineering, manufacturing engineering, industrial engineering, chemical engineering)—plus practical, real-world experience to be effective as systems engineers. Undergraduate university programs explicitly in systems engineering are growing in number but remain uncommon, the degrees including such material most often presented as a BS in Industrial Engineering. Typically programs (either by themselves or in combination with interdisciplinary study) are offered beginning at the graduate level in both academic and professional tracks, resulting in the grant of either a MS/MEng or Ph.D./EngD degree.

INCOSE, in collaboration with the Systems Engineering Research Center at Stevens Institute of Technology maintains a regularly updated directory of worldwide academic programs at suitably accredited institutions. As of 2017, it lists over 140 universities in North America offering more than 400 undergraduate and graduate programs in systems engineering. Widespread institutional acknowledgment of the field as a distinct subdiscipline is quite recent; the 2009 edition of the same publication reported the number of such schools and programs at only 80 and 165, respectively.

Education in systems engineering can be taken as systems-centric or domain-centric:
 Systems-centric programs treat systems engineering as a separate discipline and most of the courses are taught focusing on systems engineering principles and practice.
 Domain-centric programs offer systems engineering as an option that can be exercised with another major field in engineering.
Both of these patterns strive to educate the systems engineer who is able to oversee interdisciplinary projects with the depth required of a core-engineer.

Systems engineering topics
Systems engineering tools are strategies, procedures, and techniques that aid in performing systems engineering on a project or product. The purpose of these tools vary from database management, graphical browsing, simulation, and reasoning, to document production, neutral import/export and more.

System
There are many definitions of what a system is in the field of systems engineering. Below are a few authoritative definitions:

 ANSI/EIA-632-1999: "An aggregation of end products and enabling products to achieve a given purpose."
 DAU Systems Engineering Fundamentals: "an integrated composite of people, products, and processes that provide a capability to satisfy a stated need or objective."
 IEEE Std 1220-1998: "A set or arrangement of elements and processes that are related and whose behavior satisfies customer/operational needs and provides for life cycle sustainment of the products."
 INCOSE Systems Engineering Handbook: "homogeneous entity that exhibits predefined behavior in the real world and is composed of heterogeneous parts that do not individually exhibit that behavior and an integrated configuration of components and/or subsystems."
 INCOSE: "A system is a construct or collection of different elements that together produce results not obtainable by the elements alone. The elements, or parts, can include people, hardware, software, facilities, policies, and documents; that is, all things required to produce systems-level results. The results include system level qualities, properties, characteristics, functions, behavior and performance. The value added by the system as a whole, beyond that contributed independently by the parts, is primarily created by the relationship among the parts; that is, how they are interconnected."
 ISO/IEC 15288:2008: "A combination of interacting elements organized to achieve one or more stated purposes."
 NASA Systems Engineering Handbook: "(1) The combination of elements that function together to produce the capability to meet a need. The elements include all hardware, software, equipment, facilities, personnel, processes, and procedures needed for this purpose. (2) The end product (which performs operational functions) and enabling products (which provide life-cycle support services to the operational end products) that make up a system."

Systems engineering processes
Systems engineering processes encompass all creative, manual and technical activities necessary to define the product and which need to be carried out to convert a system definition to a sufficiently detailed system design specification for product manufacture and deployment. Design and development of a system can be divided into four stages, each with different definitions: 
 Task definition (informative definition)
 Conceptual stage (cardinal definition)
 Design stage (formative definition)
 Implementation stage (manufacturing definition)

Depending on their application, tools are used for various stages of the systems engineering process:

Using models
Models play important and diverse roles in systems engineering. A model can be defined in several
ways, including:
 An abstraction of reality designed to answer specific questions about the real world
 An imitation, analogue, or representation of a real world process or structure; or
 A conceptual, mathematical, or physical tool to assist a decision maker.
Together, these definitions are broad enough to encompass physical engineering models used in the verification of a system design, as well as schematic models like a functional flow block diagram and mathematical (i.e. quantitative) models used in the trade study process. This section focuses on the last.

The main reason for using mathematical models and diagrams in trade studies is to provide estimates of system effectiveness, performance or technical attributes, and cost from a set of known or estimable quantities. Typically, a collection of separate models is needed to provide all of these outcome variables. The heart of any mathematical model is a set of meaningful quantitative relationships among its inputs and outputs. These relationships can be as simple as adding up constituent quantities to obtain a total, or as complex as a set of differential equations describing the trajectory of a spacecraft in a gravitational field. Ideally, the relationships express causality, not just correlation. Furthermore, key to successful systems engineering activities are also the methods with which these models are efficiently and effectively managed and used to simulate the systems. However, diverse domains often present recurring problems of modeling and simulation for systems engineering, and new advancements are aiming to cross-fertilize methods among distinct scientific and engineering communities, under the title of 'Modeling & Simulation-based Systems Engineering'.

Modeling formalisms and graphical representations
Initially, when the primary purpose of a systems engineer is to comprehend a complex problem, graphic representations of a system are used to communicate a system's functional and data requirements. Common graphical representations include:
 Functional flow block diagram (FFBD)
 Model-based design
 Data flow diagram (DFD)
 N2 chart
 IDEF0 diagram
 Use case diagram
 Sequence diagram
 Block diagram
 Signal-flow graph
 USL function maps and type maps
 Enterprise architecture frameworks

A graphical representation relates the various subsystems or parts of a system through functions, data, or interfaces. Any or each of the above methods are used in an industry based on its requirements. For instance, the N2 chart may be used where interfaces between systems is important. Part of the design phase is to create structural and behavioral models of the system.

Once the requirements are understood, it is now the responsibility of a systems engineer to refine them, and to determine, along with other engineers, the best technology for a job. At this point starting with a trade study, systems engineering encourages the use of weighted choices to determine the best option. A decision matrix, or Pugh method, is one way (QFD is another) to make this choice while considering all criteria that are important. The trade study in turn informs the design, which again affects graphic representations of the system (without changing the requirements). In an SE process, this stage represents the iterative step that is carried out until a feasible solution is found. A decision matrix is often populated using techniques such as statistical analysis, reliability analysis, system dynamics (feedback control), and optimization methods.

Other tools
Systems Modeling Language (SysML), a modeling language used for systems engineering applications, supports the specification, analysis, design, verification and validation of a broad range of complex systems.

Lifecycle Modeling Language (LML), is an open-standard modeling language designed for systems engineering that supports the full lifecycle: conceptual, utilization, support and retirement stages.

Related fields and sub-fields
Many related fields may be considered tightly coupled to systems engineering. The following areas have contributed to the development of systems engineering as a distinct entity:
 Cognitive systems engineering
 Cognitive systems engineering (CSE) is a specific approach to the description and analysis of human-machine systems or sociotechnical systems. The three main themes of CSE are how humans cope with complexity, how work is accomplished by the use of artifacts, and how human-machine systems and socio-technical systems can be described as joint cognitive systems. CSE has since its beginning become a recognized scientific discipline, sometimes also referred to as cognitive engineering. The concept of a Joint Cognitive System (JCS) has in particular become widely used as a way of understanding how complex socio-technical systems can be described with varying degrees of resolution. The more than 20 years of experience with CSE has been described extensively.
 Configuration management
 Like systems engineering, configuration management as practiced in the defense and aerospace industry is a broad systems-level practice. The field parallels the taskings of systems engineering; where systems engineering deals with requirements development, allocation to development items and verification, configuration management deals with requirements capture, traceability to the development item, and audit of development item to ensure that it has achieved the desired functionality that systems engineering and/or Test and Verification Engineering have proven out through objective testing.
 Control engineering
 Control engineering and its design and implementation of control systems, used extensively in nearly every industry, is a large sub-field of systems engineering. The cruise control on an automobile and the guidance system for a ballistic missile are two examples. Control systems theory is an active field of applied mathematics involving the investigation of solution spaces and the development of new methods for the analysis of the control process.
 Industrial engineering
 Industrial engineering is a branch of engineering that concerns the development, improvement, implementation and evaluation of integrated systems of people, money, knowledge, information, equipment, energy, material and process. Industrial engineering draws upon the principles and methods of engineering analysis and synthesis, as well as mathematical, physical and social sciences together with the principles and methods of engineering analysis and design to specify, predict, and evaluate results obtained from such systems.
 Production Systems Engineering
 Production Systems Engineering (PSE) is an emerging branch of Engineering intended to uncover fundamental principles of production systems and utilize them for analysis, continuous improvement, and design. 
 Interface design
 Interface design and its specification are concerned with assuring that the pieces of a system connect and inter-operate with other parts of the system and with external systems as necessary. Interface design also includes assuring that system interfaces be able to accept new features, including mechanical, electrical and logical interfaces, including reserved wires, plug-space, command codes and bits in communication protocols. This is known as extensibility. Human-Computer Interaction (HCI) or Human-Machine Interface (HMI) is another aspect of interface design, and is a critical aspect of modern systems engineering. Systems engineering principles are applied in the design of communication protocols for local area networks and wide area networks.
 Mechatronic engineering
 Mechatronic engineering, like systems engineering, is a multidisciplinary field of engineering that uses dynamical systems modeling to express tangible constructs. In that regard it is almost indistinguishable from Systems Engineering, but what sets it apart is the focus on smaller details rather than larger generalizations and relationships. As such, both fields are distinguished by the scope of their projects rather than the methodology of their practice.
 Operations research
 Operations research supports systems engineering. Operations research, briefly, is concerned with the optimization of a process under multiple constraints.
 Performance engineering
 Performance engineering is the discipline of ensuring a system meets customer expectations for performance throughout its life. Performance is usually defined as the speed with which a certain operation is executed, or the capability of executing a number of such operations in a unit of time. Performance may be degraded when operations queued to execute is throttled by limited system capacity. For example, the performance of a packet-switched network is characterized by the end-to-end packet transit delay, or the number of packets switched in an hour. The design of high-performance systems uses analytical or simulation modeling, whereas the delivery of high-performance implementation involves thorough performance testing. Performance engineering relies heavily on statistics, queueing theory and probability theory for its tools and processes.
 Program management and project management
 Program management (or programme management) has many similarities with systems engineering, but has broader-based origins than the engineering ones of systems engineering. Project management is also closely related to both program management and systems engineering.
 Proposal engineering
 Proposal engineering is the application of scientific and mathematical principles to design, construct, and operate a cost-effective proposal development system. Basically, proposal engineering uses the "systems engineering process" to create a cost-effective proposal and increase the odds of a successful proposal.
 Reliability engineering
 Reliability engineering is the discipline of ensuring a system meets customer expectations for reliability throughout its life (i.e. it does not fail more frequently than expected). Next to prediction of failure, it is just as much about prevention of failure. Reliability engineering applies to all aspects of the system. It is closely associated with maintainability, availability (dependability or RAMS preferred by some), and logistics engineering. Reliability engineering is always a critical component of safety engineering, as in failure mode and effects analysis (FMEA) and hazard fault tree analysis, and of security engineering.
 Risk management
 Risk management, the practice of assessing and dealing with risk is one of the interdisciplinary parts of Systems Engineering. In development, acquisition, or operational activities, the inclusion of risk in tradeoff with cost, schedule, and performance features, involves the iterative complex configuration management of traceability and evaluation to the scheduling and requirements management across domains and for the system lifecycle that requires the interdisciplinary technical approach of systems engineering. Systems Engineering has Risk Management define, tailor, implement, and monitor a structured process for risk management which is integrated to the overall effort.
 Safety engineering
 The techniques of safety engineering may be applied by non-specialist engineers in designing complex systems to minimize the probability of safety-critical failures. The "System Safety Engineering" function helps to identify "safety hazards" in emerging designs, and may assist with techniques to "mitigate" the effects of (potentially) hazardous conditions that cannot be designed out of systems.
 Scheduling
 Scheduling is one of the systems engineering support tools as a practice and item in assessing interdisciplinary concerns under configuration management. In particular the direct relationship of resources, performance features, and risk to duration of a task or the dependency links among tasks and impacts across the system lifecycle are systems engineering concerns.
 Security engineering
 Security engineering can be viewed as an interdisciplinary field that integrates the community of practice for control systems design, reliability, safety and systems engineering. It may involve such sub-specialties as authentication of system users, system targets and others: people, objects and processes.
 Software engineering
 From its beginnings, software engineering has helped shape modern systems engineering practice. The techniques used in the handling of the complexities of large software-intensive systems have had a major effect on the shaping and reshaping of the tools, methods and processes of Systems Engineering.

See also

 Arcadia (engineering)
 Control engineering
 Design review (U.S. government)
 Engineering management
 Engineering information management
 Enterprise systems engineering
 Industrial engineering
 Interdisciplinarity
 List of production topics
 List of requirements engineering tools
 List of systems engineers
 List of types of systems engineering
 Management cybernetics
 Model-based systems engineering
 Operations management
 Structured systems analysis and design method
 System of systems engineering (SoSE)
 System accident
 Systems architecture
 Systems development life cycle 
 Systems thinking (e.g. theory of constraints, value-stream mapping)
 System information modelling

References

Further reading
 Blockley, D. Godfrey, P. Doing it Differently: Systems for Rethinking Infrastructure, Second Edition, ICE Publications, London, 2017.
 Buede, D.M., Miller, W.D. The Engineering Design of Systems: Models and Methods, Third Edition, John Wiley and Sons, 2016.
 Chestnut, H., Systems Engineering Methods. Wiley, 1967.
 Gianni, D. et al. (eds.), Modeling and Simulation-Based Systems Engineering Handbook, CRC Press, 2014 at CRC
 Goode, H.H., Robert E. Machol System Engineering: An Introduction to the Design of Large-scale Systems, McGraw-Hill, 1957.
 Hitchins, D. (1997) World Class Systems Engineering at hitchins.net.
 Lienig, J., Bruemmer, H., Fundamentals of Electronic Systems Design, Springer, 2017 .
 Malakooti, B. (2013). Operations and Production Systems with Multiple Objectives. John Wiley & Sons.
 MITRE, The MITRE Systems Engineering Guide(pdf)
 NASA (2007) Systems Engineering Handbook, NASA/SP-2007-6105 Rev1, December 2007. 
 NASA (2013) NASA Systems Engineering Processes and Requirements NPR 7123.1B, April 2013 NASA Procedural Requirements
 Oliver, D.W., et al. Engineering Complex Systems with Models and Objects. McGraw-Hill, 1997.
 Parnell, G.S., Driscoll, P.J., Henderson, D.L. (eds.), Decision Making in Systems Engineering and Management, 2nd. ed., Hoboken, NJ: Wiley, 2011.  This is a textbook for undergraduate students of engineering.
 Ramo, S., St.Clair, R.K. The Systems Approach: Fresh Solutions to Complex Problems Through Combining Science and Practical Common Sense, Anaheim, CA: KNI, Inc, 1998.
 Sage, A.P., Systems Engineering. Wiley IEEE, 1992. .
 Sage, A.P., Olson, S.R., Modeling and Simulation in Systems Engineering, 2001.
 SEBOK.org, Systems Engineering Body of Knowledge (SEBoK)
 Shermon, D. Systems Cost Engineering, Gower publishing, 2009
 Shishko, R., et al. (2005) [https://openlibrary.org/books/OL23710690M/NASA_systems_engineering_handbook NASA Systems Engineering Handbook]. NASA Center for AeroSpace Information, 2005.
 Stevens, R., et al. Systems Engineering: Coping with Complexity. Prentice Hall, 1998.
 US Air Force, SMC Systems Engineering Primer & Handbook, 2004
 US DoD Systems Management College (2001) Systems Engineering Fundamentals.'' Defense Acquisition University Press, 2001
 US DoD Guide for Integrating Systems Engineering into DoD Acquisition Contracts , 2006
 US DoD MIL-STD-499 System Engineering Management

External links

 ICSEng homepage.
 INCOSE homepage.
 INCOSE UK homepage
 PPI SE Goldmine homepage
 Systems Engineering Body of Knowledge
 Systems Engineering Tools List of systems engineering tools
 AcqNotes DoD Systems Engineering Overview 
 NDIA Systems Engineering Division

 
Engineering disciplines